Emmanuel Church, Wimbledon is a proprietary chapel of the Church of England located on Ridgeway in the London borough of Wimbledon. The current minister is Robin Weekes, who was appointed in March 2013.

In 2019, reports emerged that the former church minister, Jonathan Fletcher, had committed acts of abusive behaviour. The church created a website called "Walking With" to support the victims, and commissioned an independent review from safeguarding charity thirtyone:eight.

References

External links 

 Church website
 Walking With - support website

Further reading 

 thirtyone:eight (21 March 2021). Independent Lessons Learned Review (incorporating an Audit of Safeguarding Arrangements) Concerning Jonathan Fletcher and Emmanuel Church Wimbledon

Churches in London
Sexual abuse scandals in Protestantism